The Pfalz D.III was a fighter aircraft used by the  Luftstreitkräfte (Imperial German Air Service) during the First World War. The D.III was the first major original design from Pfalz Flugzeugwerke. Though generally considered inferior to contemporary Albatros and Fokker fighters, the D.III was widely used by the Jagdstaffeln from late 1917 to mid-1918. It continued to serve as a training aircraft until the end of the war.

Design and development

Prior to World War I, Pfalz Flugzeugwerke produced Morane-Saulnier monoplane designs under license. These aircraft entered military service as the Pfalz A- and E-series. In September 1916, Pfalz began producing the first of 20 Roland D.I and 200 Roland D.II fighters under license.

In November 1916, Pfalz hired Rudolph Gehringer from Flugzeugbau Friedrichshafen GmbH. As Pfalz's new chief engineer, Gehringer immediately commenced work on an original fighter design. The resulting D.III emerged in April 1917. Like the Rolands, the D.III used a plywood monocoque fuselage. Two layers of thin plywood strips were placed over a mold to form one half of a fuselage shell. The fuselage halves were then glued together, covered with a layer of fabric, and doped. This Wickelrumpf (wrapped body) method was a patented invention of the LFG firm. It gave the fuselage great strength, light weight, and smooth contours compared to conventional construction techniques. However, it also proved to be more labor-intensive and expensive. Furthermore, fuselages of the Wickelrumpf type proved to be liable to twisting or warping in service, affecting performance as well as causing control problems. This has been attributed to moisture absorption in damp front-line conditions or to the use of insufficiently seasoned wood.

The wings were of conventional construction, with a flush Teves und Braun radiator offset to the right side of the upper wing. The ailerons were wooden, rather than the more usual steel tube construction. The horizontal stabilizer had an inverted airfoil section, which facilitated dive recovery and permitted the use of an unbalanced elevator.

Idflieg found the prototype promising. It directed Pfalz to halt production of the Roland D.III and to complete the balance of the contract, 70 aircraft, to the new design. After a Typenprüfung (type test) at Adlershof in May, the Idflieg ordered various modifications, including an enlarged rudder and horn-balanced ailerons. In June 1917, Pfalz received a second order for 300 aircraft.

Operational history

Deliveries to operational units began in August 1917. Jasta 10 was the first recipient of the new aircraft, followed by Jasta 4. While markedly better than the earlier Roland designs, the D.III was generally considered inferior to the Albatros D.III and D.V. German pilots variously criticized the Pfalz's heavy controls, low speed, lack of power, or low rate of climb compared to the Albatros. The D.III slipped in turns, leading to crashes when unwary pilots turned at very low altitudes. Moreover, the Pfalz stalled sharply and spun readily. Recovery from the resulting flat spin was difficult, though some pilots took advantage of this trait to descend quickly or evade enemy aircraft.

The Pfalz's primary advantage was its strength and sturdiness. The Albatros scouts were plagued by failure of their single-spar lower wings. The Pfalz, however, could safely dive at high speeds due to its twin-spar lower wing. For this reason, the Pfalz was well-suited to diving attacks on observation balloons, which were usually heavily defended by anti-aircraft guns trained to the balloon's altitude.

D.IIIa
The most pressing complaint about the new Pfalz was that the guns were buried in the fuselage, preventing pilots from clearing gun jams in flight. This feature had been carried over from the earlier Roland designs. In November 1917, Pfalz responded by producing the slightly modified D.IIIa, which relocated the guns to the upper fuselage decking. The D.IIIa was distinguishable by its enlarged semicircular horizontal stabilizer and cropped lower wingtips. It also featured a more powerful version of the Mercedes D.III engine.

Pfalz built approximately 260 D.III and 750 D.IIIa aircraft. Most were delivered to Bavarian Jastas. Once Pfalz completed the final batch in May 1918, production shifted to the D.IIIa's successor, the D.XII. Some aircraft from the final D.IIIa batch were delivered to Turkey.

As of 30 April 1918, 433 D.IIIa scouts were still in frontline use. By 31 August, that number had declined to 166. Many serviceable aircraft were sent to advanced training schools, but approximately 100 aircraft remained in frontline use at the time of the Armistice.

Operators

Luftstreitkräfte
Kaiserliche Marine

Ottoman Air Force

Replica aircraft

Today, there are no known surviving D.III airframes. However, two flying replicas were built for the 1966 film The Blue Max. One replica was built from scratch, while a second was converted from a de Havilland Tiger Moth airframe. Both replicas are currently based in New Zealand. A third flying replica was built by Ron Kitchen of Nevada in 1987 but is now on static display at the Cavanaugh Flight Museum in Addison, Texas.

Another, static replica was built by the modern Pfalz company in 2005 and is on display at the Auto und Technik Museum in Speyer.

Specifications (D.IIIa)

See also

References

Notes

Bibliography
 Gray, Peter and Owen Thetford. German Aircraft of the First World War. London: Putnam, 1962. .
 Grosz, Peter M. Pfalz D.IIIa (Windsock Datafile No. 21). Berkhamsted, Herts, UK: Albatros Publications, 1995. .
 Guttman, Jon. Balloon-Busting Aces of World War 1 (Aircraft of the Aces No. 66). Oxford: Osprey Publishing, 2005. .
 Herris, Jack. Pfalz Aircraft of World War I (Great War Aircraft in Profile, Volume 4). Boulder, Colorado: Flying Machine Press, 2001. .

 VanWyngarden, Greg. Pfalz Scout Aces of World War I (Aircraft of the Aces No. 71). Oxford: Osprey Publishing, 2006. .
 Wagner, Ray and Heinz Nowarra. German Combat Planes: A Comprehensive Survey and History of the Development of German Military Aircraft from 1914.  New York: Doubleday, 1971.

1910s German fighter aircraft
Military aircraft of World War I
D.III
Sesquiplanes
Aircraft first flown in 1917